Metro Wilanowska is a station on Line M1 of the Warsaw Metro, located in the Mokotów district of Warsaw  at the junction of Aleja Niepodległości, Puławska Street, and Aleja Wilanowska, all main streets of Warsaw. It is an important transfer point to a large bus station, serving routes through the city and to the surrounding towns and villages.

The station was opened on 7 April 1995 as part of the inaugural stretch of the Warsaw Metro, between Kabaty and Politechnika.

Cultural references
Polish rock group Elektryczne Gitary recorded a Polish-language cover of the Kinks' song Waterloo Sunset, which they named Stacja Wilanowska after the station, for their 1997 album Na Krzywy Ryj.

References

External links

Railway stations in Poland opened in 1995
Line 1 (Warsaw Metro) stations
Mokotów